Ani Kostova (born 13 April 1960) is a Bulgarian swimmer. She competed in the women's 4 × 100 metre freestyle relay at the 1980 Summer Olympics.

References

1960 births
Living people
Bulgarian female swimmers
Olympic swimmers of Bulgaria
Swimmers at the 1980 Summer Olympics
Sportspeople from Sofia
Bulgarian female freestyle swimmers
20th-century Bulgarian women
21st-century Bulgarian women